"Cheater" is a song written by Michael Jackson and Greg Phillinganes and was originally slated to appear on Jackson's seventh studio album, Bad (1987), but it was removed from the track listing for unknown reasons.

After being sent to US and UK radio stations, the full commercial release of "Cheater" was cancelled for unspecified reasons, turning the song into a promotional single and releasing on September 14, 2004. The song was then released on November 16, 2004 on The Ultimate Collection album.

Background
"Cheater" was written and produced by Michael Jackson, and co-written by Greg Phillinganes. The song was originally intended for Jackson's seventh studio album, Bad (1987). However, it failed to make into the final track listing. However, the full commercial release was cancelled for unspecified reasons, with the song being released as part of the box set.

As promotion of the limited edition box set from The Ultimate Collection, Epic Records distributed a sampler of the compilation featuring twelve tracks. Eight songs were previously released, while four – "Beautiful Girl", "Scared of the Moon", "We've Had Enough", and "Cheater" – remained unreleased until the compilation's release. The sampler was titled Highlights From The Ultimate Collection in the United States, and The Ultimate Collection Sampler in Europe.

A music video was also shown on some channels; it features clips from the Live in Bucharest: The Dangerous Tour DVD, which was included in the same album the song appears in.

Critical reception
The song received positive critical reception. Stephen Thomas Erlewine of Allmusic described this song as "good stuff" and described "Cheater" as "so funky, loose, and alive that it's hard not to wish that Jackson didn't fuss over his albums and just record like this all the time."

Track listing
Digital download
 "Cheater" (Demo) – 5:08

Europe Promo
 "Cheater" (Radio Edit) – 3:58

UK 12" Vinyl
 "Cheater" (Demo) – 5:09
 "One More Chance" (R. Kelly Remix) – 3:50

Credits and personnel
 Michael Jackson - songwriting, production, lead and background vocals
 Greg Phillinganes - songwriting, piano, synthesizers
 Bill Bottrell and Matt Forger - audio engineering
 David Williams - guitar

Credits adapted from The Ultimate Collection liner notes.

References

2004 songs
2004 singles
Michael Jackson songs
Songs written by Michael Jackson
Song recordings produced by Michael Jackson
Epic Records singles
Songs written by Greg Phillinganes
American hip hop songs